Haucke is a German language surname. It stems from the male given name Hugo – and may refer to:
Gert Haucke (1929–2008), German film and television actor
Rayk Haucke, Paralympian athlete from Germany
Tobias Haucke (1987), German field hockey player
Volker Haucke (1968), German biochemist and cell biologist

References 

German-language surnames
Surnames from given names